North Hollywood is a 2021 film written and directed by Mikey Alfred. The film is loosely based on Alfred's life and his relationship with his father. The film stars Ryder McLaughlin, Vince Vaughn, and Miranda Cosgrove. Alfred began looking for funding to produce and direct the film in 2018, after being a co-producer on Mid90s (2018).

Plot
Michael is a high school graduate living in North Hollywood, California with dreams of becoming a professional skateboarder. After being noticed by two professional skaters, Michael quits his water polo team to focus exclusively on skating. This leads to tension within Michael's relationship with his friends and his father. Michael thinks that his friends, Jay and Adolf, are not taking skating as seriously as him and he does not want to waste time with them. For this reason he starts to skate with them less and more with the professional skaters, which adds to the tension in their relationships. His father does not see skating as a realistic career and wants him to go to college and pursue stable employment. Michael is ultimately faced with the decision between choosing the future his father wants, or following his dream of becoming a professional skater.

Cast
 Ryder McLaughlin as Michael
 Vince Vaughn as Oliver
 Miranda Cosgrove as Rachel
 Nico Hiraga as Jay
 Aramis Hudson as Adolf
 Angus Cloud as Walker
 Tyshawn Jones as Isiah Jordan
 Bob Worrest as Nolan Knox
 Sparkle Tatyana-Marie as Rachel’s friend
 Blake Anderson as School Security Guard
 Gillian Jacobs as Abigaile
 Sunny Suljic as Clark
 Thomas Barbusca as Alter Boy
 Griffin Gluck as Drew
 Nate Hinds as Rubo

Cameos 
There are several cameos in North Hollywood, ranging from popular skaters, actors, musicians, and entrepreneurs.

Andrew Reynolds, founder of Baker Skateboards and professional skater is seen at the table scene
Louie Lopez, professional skater for Converse, Independent trucks, Hardies Hardware, and Mob Grip is seen at the table scene
Kader Sylla, skater sponsored by Baker Skateboards is seen as a ticketer in the film
Davonte Jolly, skate filmer, is seen filming in the movie
Sunny Suljic, skateboarder and star of the film "mid90s" is seen twice in the movie
Na-Kel Smith, actor, musician, and professional skater for Fucking Awesome and Supreme is seen multiple times in the film
Zach Saraceno, a professional skater for Illegal Civ is seen in the film
Kevin White, professional skater for Illegal Civ, and sponsored by Hardies Hardware is seen in the film
Jason Dill, professional skater and co-founder of Fucking Awesome is shown as Father Mahoney in the film
The Garden, popular band from Orange County, California.
Angus Cloud, American actor best known for his role of Fezco in the HBO television series Euphoria

Release 
The film had its world premiere starting on March 26, 2021 at the SoFi Stadium in Inglewood, California. It was the first public event for the Sofi Stadium. Due to the pandemic, it was a drive-in style. The premiere was hosted for 3 nights in a row.

Reception
In the United States' review aggregator, the Rotten Tomatoes, in the score where the site staff categorizes the opinions of independent media and mainstream media only positive or negative, the film has an approval rating of 78% calculated based on 18 critics reviews. By comparison, with the same opinions being calculated using a weighted arithmetic mean, the score achieved is 6.0/10.

References

External links

Skateboarding films
Films set in California
2020s English-language films
American sports comedy-drama films
2020s American films